This is a list of public art in Swansea, Wales.

Maritime Quarter

Swansea City Centre

Brynmill

Blackpill and Mumbles

Morriston

References

Swansea-related lists
Mass media and culture in Swansea
Swansea
Swansea